A Million Dollar Dream is a Chinese television drama that aired on the Singaporean television channel Mediacorp Channel 8. The show aired at 9pm on weekdays and had a repeat telecast at 8am the following day. It stars Chen Hanwei and Zoe Tay.

Cast

Luo (Yu'ai)'s family

Hu (Tianhao)'s family

Other cast members

Cameo appearances

Awards & Nominations
A Million Dollar Dream is up for 6 nominations.

The other dramas nominated for Best Drama Serial 
are  Blessings 2, 
Say Cheese , VIC &
You Can Be An Angel 3.

It won 3 out of 6 nominations , which are Best Supporting Actor, Best Actress & Best Actor.

Star Awards 2019

Original Sound Track (OST)

See also
 List of programmes broadcast by Mediacorp Channel 8

References

Mediacorp Chinese language programmes
Singapore Chinese dramas
2018 Singaporean television series debuts
Channel 8 (Singapore) original programming